Sri Kuala Lumpur International School (Sri KL) is a British private non-profit educational institution located in Subang Jaya, Petaling District, Selangor, Malaysia. Sri KL was officially declared a SMART SCHOOL by former Malaysian Minister of Education, Tan Sri Musa Muhammad in June 2000.

The school was founded as Sri Kuala Lumpur Primary School in 1969, with Sri Kuala Lumpur Secondary School being officially incorporated in 1987. It is wholly owned and managed by Othman Merican Educational Development Berhad, a not-for-profit foundation.

Sri KL medium of instruction is predominantly English.

In national competitions, such as The Star R.AGE Cheerleading Competition, the school's team has won the national title multiple times. The school's orchestra and wind band perform at national and international competitions as well. Sri KL actively participates in MSSD and gained victories in golf, tennis, squash, waterpolo, basketball, netball, cross country and others.

Notable Sri KL alumni include Julian Yee, 2017 and 2019 Southeast Asian (SEA) Games figure skating gold medalist. Julian also represented Malaysia at the 2018 Winter Olympics,Carmen Lim, Best Female Athlete at the 2016 Malaysian Para Games in Sarawak.

History 
Sri Kuala Lumpur Primary School was established by the late Tan Sri Dato’ Ir. Othman Merican in January 1978 at Jalan Nipah, Kuala Lumpur with an initial enrolment of six students. In August 1979, the school moved to Jalan Anak Gasing. Enrolment had increased to 100 by January 1980 and over 300, when it moved to Jalan Ampang 12 months later. Further move occurred in December 1984, to Taman Mayang, Petaling Jaya. 

Finally, in January 1986  Sri KL moved to its current location in SS15, Subang Jaya. Secondary school was subsequently opened in 1987. In 2005, the then Education Minister, Dato Seri Hishamuddin Tun Hussein declared the new facilities block to be opened. 

Sri KL introduced the smart school concept in the primary school during 1995. The secondary school was officially declared a  SMART SCHOOL by the Minister of Education, Tan Sri Musa Mohamad in 2000.

Beginning 2010, Year 1 and 2 started the Cambridge international curriculum. In the same year, secondary students from Year 7 (Form 1) could have the choice of studying the government (KBSM) or Cambridge syllabus. As of 2017, all primary students sat for Cambridge Primary Checkpoint and secondary students sat for the Cambridge IGCSE exam while Malaysian citizens were also required to sit for the Sijil Pelajaran Menengah (SPM) Bahasa Malaysia paper.

School system 
Sri Kuala Lumpur starts its school academic year in January and ends around late November. The school day starts at 0750hrs and ends at 1530hrs for primary school students, and 1540hrs for secondary school students.   

Students are sorted into classes, which typically have 30 students each and have their own classrooms. Classes usually have one main teacher responsible for it, except for Year 1 where there is an additional assistant teacher alongside a monitor as well as 2 assistant monitors elected by the Homeroom Teacher.  

Class names are based on level and local fruits for primary classes and a Greek letter for secondary classes. For example: "6 Rambai". The "6" stands for Year 6, and "Rambai" is the Class name: Year:[6]Class:[Rambai].  

Primary school switched from National syllabus to Cambridge Primary Programme in 2010.

Secondary school adopted Cambridge IGCSE in 2010, however all Malaysian secondary school citizens are also required to sit for the Bahasa Malaysia paper in Sijil Pelajaran Menengah (SPM), whilst students can also opt to sit for the Youth Chinese Test.

Except for students in Year 10 or 11, students are not allowed to pick or drop subjects.

Enrolment and Entry Requirement 
Students are required to pass an Entrance Assessment Test and must live in  Malaysia. Due to the long waiting list, parents register as early as 2 years in advance to secure a place in the Entrance Assessment Test.

Messages from the Principals 
Messages from the Primary Principal Dr. Cheah Swi Ee and Secondary Principal Mr. Tan Sun Seng.

Facilities 
All classes are air-conditioned. Each class has a whiteboard, message board and 2 push-pin boards, one at the front right side and one at the back. Classes also have additional facilities such as Promethean Activboards, SMART boards and Epson Multimedia Projectors. Teachers and students use these boards for presentations and interactive teaching. Each class can hold a maximum of 30 students. Teachers have a remote control and an ActivPen for their use in teaching. The staff room is well stocked with teaching materials, and iMacs for use. Each department has a computer to assist in teaching.

There are 2 canteens, the Primary Canteen being located adjacent to the Primary Courtyard and the Great Hall, while the Secondary Canteen being adjacent to the football field. The Great Hall is used for assembly on Mondays and Thursdays, but is also used for tests, competitions, performances, and events. There is also a swimming pool, a library, multiple playgrounds, an art room, a music room, a staff room and two football/basketball courts. On the secondary side, there is a gym, library, dance room, book shop, another staff room, a nurse's office, and an auditorium.

Extracurricular activities and sports 

Sri Kuala Lumpur School is host to a wide variety of clubs and societies, and its music program primarily consists of an orchestra and a wind band.

The school also offers basketball, cross-country running, football, futsal, netball, swimming, table tennis, and track and field. In addition, there is also Choir, Chess, Swimming Polo, etc. The school's teams compete at district, state, and national levels. Students are divided into houses within the school, which compete against one another in athletics, such as the annual Sports Day.

Notable alumni 

Notable Sri Kuala Lumpur School alumni include:
Julian Yee, 2017 and  2019 Southeast Asian (SEA) Games figure skating gold medalist; an Olympian at 2018 Winter Olympics. 
Carmen Lim, Best Female Athlete at the 2016 Malaysian Para Games in Sarawak.

References

External links 
 

1979 establishments in Malaysia
Educational institutions established in 1979
Subang Jaya
Schools in Selangor